Bellator 258: Archuleta vs. Pettis was a mixed martial arts event produced by Bellator MMA that took place on May 7, 2021 at Mohegan Sun Arena in Uncasville, Connecticut. This fight card is notable for being Anthony Johnson's final fight before his death.

Background 
The event was headlined by current Bellator Bantamweight World Champion Juan Archuleta making his first title defense against Sergio Pettis. 

The co-main was to feature a Bellator Light Heavyweight World Grand Prix Tournament quarterfinal bout between former UFC Middleweight Title contender Yoel Romero facing off against former UFC Light-Heavyweight Title contender Anthony Johnson in their debuts for the promotion after the bout was moved from Bellator 257 to this event.  On April 29, it was announced that Romero had failed his medicals due to an eye issue and the bout was pulled from the card. Romero was also pulled from the Grand Prix. The next day, it was announced that José Augusto Azevedo would replace Romero in the bout and the Grand Prix.

Former Bellator Bantamweight title challenger Patchy Mix was expected to face James Gallagher. However, Gallagher pulled out on April 16 due to undisclosed reasons. UFC alum Albert Morales was announced as a replacement.

A lightweight bout between Patricky Freire and Peter Queally also took place at the event. 

A welterweight fight between Logan Storley and Killys Mota was to serve as the main card opener. However, Mota withdrew from the bout due to lingering issues after contracting COVID-19. Mota was replaced by Omar Hussein. Michael Page and Derek Anderson were announced as the replacement opening bout. A welterweight bout between Logan Storley and the debuting Omar Hussein was canceled on fight day before the event began, as Hussein was not medically cleared to compete.

Érik Pérez was scheduled to face Brian Moore at this event. However, Moore tested positive for COVID and pulled out of the bout. He was replaced by Blaine Shutt.

A women's flyweight bout between Valerie Loureda and Hannah Guy was set for this event, but was moved to Bellator 259.

A middleweight bout between Lorenz Larkin and Costello van Steenis was planned for this event. On April 27, it was announced that van Steenis suffered an injury during training and pulled out of the bout. On six days notice, former Bellator Middleweight Champion Rafael Carvalho was announced as the replacement.

A lightweight bout between Bryce Logan and Alan Omer was planned for this event. However, on April 29, Logan pulled out due to injury and the bout was scrapped altogether.

At weigh-ins, Johnny Soto came in at 148.5 pounds, 2.5 pounds over the featherweight limit. The fight proceeded as a catchweight matchup, with a percentage of Soto's purse going to Almeida.

Results

See also 

 2021 in Bellator MMA
 List of Bellator MMA events
 List of current Bellator fighters
 Bellator MMA Rankings

References 

Bellator MMA events
Events in Uncasville, Connecticut
2021 in mixed martial arts
May 2021 sports events in the United States
2021 in sports in Connecticut
Mixed martial arts in Connecticut
Sports competitions in Connecticut